Maurice Joyeux (January 29, 1910 – December 9, 1991) was a French writer and anarchist. He first was a mechanic then a bookseller, he is a remarkable figure in the French Libertarianism movement. His father died as a social activist.

At 1928, He joined the military services in Morocco and completed his service in Algeria.

1910 births
1991 deaths
Anarcho-communists
French anarchists
French syndicalists
Members of the French Anarchist Federation